Tawky Tawny is a fictional character, an anthropomorphic tiger who appears as a supporting character of Captain Marvel and the Marvel Family in superhero/talking animal comic book stories published by Fawcett Comics and later DC Comics.

Publication history
Created by Otto Binder and C.C. Beck in Captain Marvel Adventures #79, the traditional version of Tawky Tawny is a humanoid and well mannered tiger who wishes to be a part of human society. A friend of the Marvel Family, Tawny often participates in their adventures. Later versions introduced in the 2000s and beyond often feature Tawny as more tiger-like, though typically retaining his ability to talk.

Fictional character biography

Fawcett Comics and pre-Crisis DC Comics
Mr. Tawny made his first appearance in Captain Marvel Adventures #79 (1947), published by Fawcett Comics. The story "The Talking Tiger" introduced Mr. Tawny as a humanoid talking Bengal tiger who travels from his native India to the United States in hopes of integrating himself into American society. Although he makes every effort to be sociable, the simple presence of the talking tiger in the city terrorizes the public, leading to Captain Marvel intervening. Upon learning through the Wisdom of Solomon that Tawny is a friendly and reasonable fellow who did not mean to cause trouble, Captain Marvel helps Tawny become a respectable part of society and secures a job for him as a tour guide at the local museum.

Tawny became a regular recurring character in Captain Marvel Adventures, appearing as the best friend of Captain Marvel and his juvenile alter-ego Billy Batson, until it ceased publication in 1953. As a respectable gentleman, Tawny typically dressed in a tweed suit, and spoke and acted in a dignified manner. His second appearance, "Captain Marvel and the Return of Mr. Tawny" (from Captain Marvel Adventures #82 in 1948), featured Tawny's origin story: Tawny had been a regular tiger who was accused of killing a man. To allow Tawny to clear his name, a local hermit gave him a serum that gave him the ability to speak and stand upright like a human. A contest was introduced in Captain Marvel Adventures #90 for the readers to submit entries for what Mr. Tawny's first name might be, with the winning entry by Mary Garrisi and Pat Laughlin of Detroit, MI, "Tawky" (a deliberate misspelling of "talky"), being introduced in Captain Marvel Adventures #96. Writer Otto Binder and artist C. C. Beck unsuccessfully attempted to launch a newspaper comic strip featuring Mr. Tawny in 1953.

Following the end of the publication of Captain Marvel Adventures when Fawcett Comics discontinued all of their superhero comics (see National Comics Publications v. Fawcett Publications), Tawny later resurfaced when DC Comics licensed (and later bought) the rights to the Fawcett characters and began publishing new Captain Marvel stories, along with Fawcett reprints, under the comic book title Shazam! beginning in 1973.

Post-Crisis DC Comics
Tawky Tawny was written out of continuity following DC's Crisis on Infinite Earths maxiseries in 1985-86. A new version of the character was introduced by Jerry Ordway and Peter Krause in DC's The Power of Shazam! graphic novel in 1994 and its subsequent comic book series spinoff in 1995. In the graphic novel, "Tawky Tawny" was a popular children's toy doll owned by Billy Batson's sister Mary Batson; the doll plays a key part in the origin story of Black Adam by being used to hide part of the scarab necklace which allowed him to first access his powers.

The subsequent comic series features the stuffed doll gaining the power from the evil demon Lord Satanus to transform into a six-foot anthropomorphic tiger who self-describes as a pooka, with The Power of Shazam! #4 being his first appearance in the series. Tawny is given life by Satanus to help Billy Batson and the Marvel Family in their fight against his sister, the demon Blaze. Under Satanus' spell, Tawny only appeared sentient to Billy, Mary, and Uncle Dudley; everyone else only sees a doll. Towards the conclusion of this story arc in The Power of Shazam! #11, Tawny is given permanent anthropomorphic form by the magical superhero Ibis the Invincible, after he proves to be more of an aid to the Marvels than Satanus intended.

Following the cancellation of The Power of Shazam! in 1999, Tawny only appeared sporadically in DC Comics stories. In 52 #16 (2006), he appears as a guest of the wedding of reformed Marvel Family villain Black Adam and his bride Isis. In The Trials of Shazam! #10 (2007), Tawny helps Freddy Freeman (formerly Captain Marvel's sidekick Captain Marvel, Jr) fight the evil Sabina, revealing a new ability to transform into a giant and powerful smilodon. In Final Crisis #6, the key miniseries of DC's 2009 Final Crisis crossover event, Tawky Tawny joined up with the All-Star Squadron and faced off against Kalibak and his Tigermen. Tawky manages to slay Kalibak and gain leadership of the Tigermen.

The New 52
In September 2011, The New 52 rebooted DC's continuity. In this new timeline, Tawny appears as a recurring character in the Shazam! backup stories published in Justice League (vol. 2) from issue #7 through #21. In these stories, Tawny is a regular tiger at the Philadelphia city zoo who is a friend of young Billy Batson. When Billy gains the power to transform into Shazam (the Captain Marvel character's name was changed at this time), Shazam finds that he can share his power with anyone he considers family. When a fight with Black Adam lands them in the zoo, Shazam attempts to give Tawny the power to turn into a giant smilodon but casts the spell incorrectly.

DC Rebirth
The anthropomorphic version of Tawky Tawny makes his proper post-Flashpoint return in Geoff Johns' current ongoing Shazam! series, making his first appearance in Shazam! (vol. 3) #4 (May 2019). 

This Tawny is a citizen of the Wildlands, one of the Seven Magiclands connected to each other via the Rock of Eternity. Despite being a realm exclusively populated by anthropomorphic animals and its humans have become extinct, the Wildlands segregates tigers from regular society and still regards them as wild animals kept in zoos. As such, Tawny is arrested for breaking "the Laws of Nature" by wearing clothes and reading a self-help book they view as 'forbidden literature' called How to Stop Eating Your Friends. When Tawny is detained, the Wildlands' African elephant mayor Krunket stated that a tiger sided with the humans during a battle which gave Krunket his facial scars. When Tawny states that he is not like that tiger, Mayor Krunket struck him with his cane while reaffirming his belief that tigers are worse than humans.

Tawny finds himself stripped naked and thrown into an enclosure where he tries to appeal to the other tigers there, declaring they can rise up against prejudice and should not be judged for what their predecessors have done. The other tigers refuse to cooperate out of fear of the mayor executing them, ignoring Tawny's protests. Tawny befriends the Shazam Family after Freddy and Darla find themselves trapped in the Wildlands and sentenced to be fed to tigers. Instead of eating them, Tawny saves the two children from his fellow tigers (all the while expressing his distaste of violence) and accompanies them on their adventures through the Magiclands after proper introductions. Tawny later moves in with Victor and Rosa Vasquez. He helps to make dinner at the time when the Marvel Family was fighting King Kid. When Tawky Tawny tries to attack Doctor Sivana during the Shazam Family's fight with the Monster Society of Evil, a Mister Mind-controlled C.C. Batson regressed Tawky Tawny to a cub. When Mister Mind is defeated, the spell used on Tawky Tawny was undone.

Other versions

Shazam! The Monster Society of Evil
In Jeff Smith's 2007 miniseries Shazam! The Monster Society of Evil, Tawky Tawny was presented as an ifrit whose natural form was a tiger, but disguised himself at times as a homeless man or a domesticated cat. Tawky, in human form, was a friend of Billy Batson when the boy was homeless living on the streets. He became the voice of reason for Captain Marvel and Mary Marvel, a role the character continued in when DC began publication of a Monster Society of Evil continuing series spin-off, Billy Batson and the Magic of Shazam!, which ran from 2008 to 2010.

Flashpoint
In the Flashpoint reality, Tawky Tawny is a companion of Captain Thunder. He appears to be an ordinary tiger, kept on a leash by one of six children who each possess one of the powers of Shazam. When the children transform into Captain Thunder, Tawny becomes a Smilodon in armor. Pedro Peña, the child who keeps Tawky on a leash, claims that due to the magic surrounding the tiger, most people only see him as a regular tabby cat.

Kingdom Come
In Mark Waid and Alex Ross' Kingdom Come miniseries, Tawky Tawny makes an appearance in the Teen Titans meta-human bar.

In other media

Television
 Tawky Tawny was a supporting character in The Kid Super Power Hour with Shazam!, voiced by Alan Oppenheimer.
 Tawky Tawny appears in Batman: The Brave and the Bold as Mary Batson's stuffed toy tiger.
 Tawky Tawny appears in the Young Justice episode "Alpha Male". This version is a genetically-enhanced Bengal tiger that Captain Marvel freed from Brain and Monsieur Mallah's control.
 Tawky Tawny appears in the "Shazam" segment of DC Nation Shorts, voiced by Brian George.

Film
 Tawky Tawny appeared in the animated short film Superman/Shazam!: The Return of Black Adam (2010), voiced by Kevin Michael Richardson. He appears as a grungy homeless man calling Billy Batson "Captain". But when Black Adam threatens to continue his wave of destruction, Tawny reveals his real identity as a mystical tiger to Superman and Captain Marvel. Black Adam recognizes Tawky Tawny as a servant of Shazam, the wizard who gave Adam and Marvel their powers. To prevent Adam from causing any further havoc, Tawny threatens to have him banished even further from Earth than before, causing the fearful Black Adam to quote the wizard's name and revert to his mortal form, which withers to dust in an instant due to being 5,000 years old. Before leaving, Tawny confirms that Shazam is indeed dead, but hints that there may have been more to his death than previously thought.
 Tawky Tawny is referenced in the 2019 live-action film Shazam!. In one scene, Shazam gives a large tiger plush to a girl and her father during the battle at the winter carnival. Billy's backpack also has a cloth patch of a tiger on the front pocket, and Shazam has a tiger symbol on the front of his cape, etched into the golden discs that secure it.
 In the 2023 sequel, Shazam: Fury of the Gods, Darla briefly adopts a ginger kitten, which she names Tawny.

References

External links
Tawky Tawny at DC Wiki
Tawky Tawny at Comic Vine

Comics characters introduced in 1947
Characters created by Otto Binder
Characters created by C. C. Beck
DC Comics animals
DC Comics male characters
DC Comics characters who are shapeshifters
DC Comics characters who can move at superhuman speeds
DC Comics characters who use magic
DC Comics characters with superhuman strength
Fictional anthropomorphic characters
Fictional characters who can change size
Fictional characters with superhuman senses
Fictional therianthropes
Fictional tigers
Marvel Family
1947 comics debuts
Legion of Super-Pets